There are at least 12 named mountains in Liberty County, Montana.
 Black Jack Butte, el. 
 Devils Chimney, el. 
 East Butte, el. 
 Hawley Hill, el. 
 Haystack Butte, el. 
 Ikes Butte, el. 
 McGuire Hill, el. 
 Morgan Hill, el. 
 Mount Brown, el. 
 Mount Lebanon, el. 
 Mount Lily, el. 
 Mount Royal, el.

See also
 List of mountains in Montana

Notes

Landforms of Liberty County, Montana
Liberty